Keith Doyle may refer to:

 Keith Doyle (footballer) (born 1979), Irish former football player
 Keith Doyle (politician) (1924–2017), Australian politician